Biljana Bradić (born 24 April 1991) is a Serbian football forward.

External links 
 
 PrvaLiga profile 

1991 births
Living people
Women's association football forwards
Serbian women's footballers
Serbia women's international footballers
Serbian expatriate women's footballers
Serbian expatriate sportspeople in Slovenia
Expatriate women's footballers in Slovenia
Serbian expatriate sportspeople in Romania
Expatriate women's footballers in Romania
ŽNK Mura players